Philip Burnett Franklin Agee (January 19, 1935 – January 7, 2008) was a Central Intelligence Agency (CIA) case officer and writer of the 1975 book, Inside the Company: CIA Diary, detailing his experiences in the CIA. Agee joined the CIA in 1957, and over the following decade had postings in Washington, D.C., Ecuador, Uruguay and Mexico. After resigning from the Agency in 1968, he became a leading opponent of CIA practices. A co-founder of the CounterSpy and CovertAction series of periodicals, he died in Cuba in January 2008.

Early years 
Agee was born in Takoma Park, Maryland and was raised in Tampa, Florida. He had, Agee wrote in On the Run, "a privileged upbringing in a big white house bordering an exclusive golf club". After graduating from Tampa's Jesuit High School, he attended the University of Notre Dame, from which he graduated cum laude in 1956. Agee later attended the University of Florida College of Law.  He served in the United States Air Force from 1957 to 1960.  Agee then worked as a case officer for the Central Intelligence Agency from 1960 to 1968, including postings to Quito, Montevideo, and Mexico City.

Leaving the CIA 
Agee stated that his Roman Catholic social conscience had made him increasingly uncomfortable with his work by the late 1960s leading to his disillusionment with the CIA and its support for authoritarian governments across Latin America. In his book Inside the Company, Agee condemned the 1968 Tlatelolco massacre in Mexico City and wrote that this was the immediate event precipitating his leaving the agency. Agee wrote that the CIA was "very pleased with his work" and had offered him "another promotion", and that his handler "was startled" when Agee told him about his plans to resign.

John Barron wrote in his book The KGB Today (1983) that Agee's resignation was forced "for a variety of reasons, including his irresponsible drinking, continuous and vulgar propositioning of embassy wives, and inability to manage his finances". Agee said these claims were ad hominem attacks meant to discredit him.

Involvement in Soviet and Cuban intelligence  
Russian exile Oleg Kalugin, former head of the KGB's Counterintelligence Directorate, claimed that in 1973 Agee approached the KGB's resident in Mexico City and offered a "treasure trove of information." According to Kalugin, the KGB was too suspicious to accept his offer.

Kalugin states that:

Agee wrote in his later work On the Run that he had no intention of working for the KGB or Cuban intelligence. He was merely following his conscience in revealing the CIA's subversion and sabotage of democratically elected governments and genuine movements for social justice.

While Agee was writing Inside the Company, the KGB kept in contact with him through Edgar Anatolyevich Cheporov, a London correspondent of the Novosti News Agency.

Agee was accused of receiving up to US$1 million in payments from the Cuban intelligence service. He denied the accusations, which were first made by a high-ranking Cuban intelligence officer and 'defector' in a 1992 Los Angeles Times report.

A later Los Angeles Times article claimed that Agee posed as a CIA Inspector General staff member in order to target a member of the CIA's Mexico City station on behalf of Cuban intelligence.  According to this story, Agee was identified during a meeting by a CIA case officer.

According to files from KGB defector Vasili Mitrokhin, Agee was sent documents by an "anonymous sender". The document was a classified State Department circular, signed by Henry Kissinger himself. In 1977, it was published with an introduction by Agee. KGB files noted by Mitrokhin claim that the originator was Service A, the Active Measures branch of the First Chief Directorate.

Mitrokhin's KGB files claim that Inside the Company: CIA Diary was "prepared by Service A, together with the Cubans". Mitrokhin's notes however do not indicate what the KGB and DGI contributed to Agee's text. The files claim that Agee removed all references to CIA penetration of Latin American Communist parties from his typescript before publication at the request of Service A.

In 1978 Agee began the publication of the Covert Action Information Bulletin . Mitrokhin's files claim that the bulletin was founded on the KGB's initiative and the group running it was "put together" by First Chief Directorate counterintelligence and that Agee was the only member of the group who was aware of KGB or DGI involvement. According to Mitrokhin's files, KGB headquarters assembled a team to keep the Bulletin supplied with material specifically designed to compromise the CIA. A document entitled "Director of Central Intelligence: Perspectives for Intelligence, 1976-1981", was supplied to Agee by the KGB. Agee highlighted in his commentary Director of Central Intelligence William Colby's complaint that the Covert Action Information Bulletin was among the most serious problems facing the CIA. Also from Mitrokhin's files: In Dirty Work 2: The CIA in Africa, Agee purportedly met with Oleg Maksimovich Nechiporenko and A. N. Istkov of the KGB and they gave him a list of CIA officers working in Africa. The files also claim that Agee decided not to identify himself as an author out of fear he would lose his residence permit in Germany.

To the end of his life, Philip Agee consistently and categorically denied ever having worked for any intelligence service after leaving the CIA. He maintained that his motives were purely altruistic. In support of this he adduces the relentless persecution he endured from the CIA, as it and the U.S. State department revoked his passport and succeeded in having him deported from several Western European countries, one after the other, until he finally found refuge in Cuba.

Memoir 
Because of legal problems in the United States, Inside the Company was first published in 1975 in Britain, while Agee was living in London. In a Playboy magazine interview after the book's publication, Agee said: "Millions of people all over the world had been killed or at least had their lives destroyed by the CIA ... I couldn't just sit by and do nothing."

Agee said that "Representatives of the Communist Party of Cuba also gave me important encouragement at a time when I doubted that I would be able to find the additional information I needed."

The London Evening News called Inside the Company: CIA Diary "a frightening picture of corruption, pressure, assassination and conspiracy". The Economist called the book "inescapable reading". Miles Copeland, Jr., a former CIA station chief in Cairo, said the book was "as complete an account of spy work as is likely to be published anywhere"  and it is "an authentic account of how an ordinary American or British 'case officer' operates ... All of it ... is presented with deadly accuracy."

The book was delayed for six months before being published in the United States; it became an immediate best seller.

Inside the Company identified 250 alleged CIA officers and agents. The list of officers and agents, all personally known to Agee, appears in an appendix to the book. While written as a diary, the book actually reconstructs events based on Agee's memory and his subsequent research.

Agee describes his first overseas assignment in 1960 to Ecuador, where his primary mission had the aim of forcing a diplomatic break between Ecuador and Cuba. He writes that the technique he used included bribery, intimidation, bugging, and forgery. Agee spent four years in Ecuador penetrating Ecuadorian politics.  He states that his actions subverted and destroyed the political fabric of Ecuador.

Agee helped bug the United Arab Republic code-room in Montevideo, Uruguay, with two contact microphones placed on the ceiling of the room below.

On December 12, 1965, Agee visited senior Uruguayan military and police officers at a Montevideo police headquarters. He realized that the screaming he heard from a nearby cell was the torturing of a Uruguayan, whose name he had given to the police as someone to watch. The Uruguayan senior officers simply turned up a radio report of a soccer game to drown out the screams.

Agee also ran CIA operations within the 1968 Mexico City Olympic Games and he witnessed the events of the Tlatelolco massacre.

Agee identified President José Figueres Ferrer of Costa Rica, President Luis Echeverría Álvarez (1970–1976) of Mexico and President Alfonso López Michelsen (1974–1978) of Colombia as CIA collaborators or agents.

Following this he details how he resigned from the CIA and began writing the book, conducting research in Cuba, London and Paris. During this time he said that the CIA spied on him.
The cover of the book featured an image of the bugged typewriter given to Agee by a CIA agent as part of their surveillance and attempts to stop publication of the book.

In 1982, the United States Congress passed the Intelligence Identities Protection Act (IIPA), legislation that seemed directly aimed at Agee's works. The law later figured in the 2003 Valerie Plame affair.

Expulsion 
Agee gained attention from the United Kingdom media after the publication of Inside the Company. He revealed the identities of dozens of CIA agents in the CIA London station.  After numerous requests from the American government as well as an MI6 report that blamed Agee's work for the execution of two MI6 agents in Poland, a request was put in to deport Agee from the UK. Agee fought this and was supported by MPs and journalists. The Labour MP Stan Newens promoted a parliamentary bill, gaining the support of more than 50 of his colleagues, which called for the CIA station in London to be expelled. The activity in support of Agee did not prevent his eventual deportation from the UK on June 3, 1977, when he traveled to the Netherlands. Agee was also eventually expelled from the Netherlands, France, West Germany and Italy.

On January 12, 1975, Agee testified before the second Bertrand Russell Tribunal in Brussels that in 1960 he had conducted personal name-checks of Venezuelan employees for a Venezuelan subsidiary of what is now ExxonMobil. Exxon was "letting the CIA assist in employment decisions, and my guess is that those name checks ... are continuing to this day". Agee stated that the CIA customarily performed this service for subsidiaries of large U.S. corporations throughout Latin America. An Exxon spokesman denied Agee's accusations.

In 1978 Agee and a small group of his supporters began publishing the Covert Action Information Bulletin, which promoted "a worldwide campaign to destabilize the CIA through exposure of its operations and personnel". Mitrokhin states that the bulletin had help from both the KGB and the Cuban DGI. The January 1979 issue of Agee's Bulletin published the infamous FM 30-31B, which was claimed by the United States House Intelligence Committee to be a hoax produced by the Soviet intelligence services. 
In 1978 and 1979, Agee published the two volumes of Dirty Work: The CIA in Western Europe and Dirty Work: The CIA in Africa which contained information on 2,000 CIA personnel.

Agee told Swiss journalist : "The CIA is plainly on the wrong side, that is, the capitalistic side. I approve KGB activities, communist activities in general. Between the overdone activities that the CIA initiates and the more modest activities of the KGB, there is absolutely no comparison."

Agee's US passport was revoked by the US government in 1979. The State Department offered him an administrative hearing to challenge the passport revocation, but Agee instead sued in federal court. The case reached the Supreme Court, which ruled against Agee in 1981.

In 1980 Maurice Bishop's government conferred citizenship of Grenada on Agee, and he took up residence on that island. The collapse of the Grenada Revolution removed that safe haven, and Agee then received a passport from the Sandinista government in Nicaragua. After a change of government there, this passport was revoked in 1990, and he was given a German passport, in accordance with the working status of his wife, the American ballet dancer Giselle Roberge who was working and living in Germany at the time. Agee was later readmitted to both the U.S. and United Kingdom. Agee's own description of his odyssey was  published in his autobiography, On the Run, in 1987.

Later activities 
In the 1980s NameBase founder Daniel Brandt had taught Agee how to use computers and computer databases for his research. Agee lived with his wife principally in Hamburg, Germany and Havana, Cuba, founding the Cubalinda.com travel website in the 1990s.

U.S. President George H. W. Bush, who considered Agee a traitor, accused him of being responsible for the murder of the head of the CIA Station in Athens, Richard Welch, by the Revolutionary Organization 17 November. Bush had directed the CIA from 1976 to 1977. Agee and his friends rejected Bush's assertion about Welch. When this accusation was included in Barbara Bush's 1994 memoir, Agee sued her for libel. Barbara Bush agreed to remove the allegation from the paperback edition of her book as part of a legal settlement.

On December 16, 2007, Agee was admitted to a hospital in Havana, and surgery was performed on him for perforated ulcers. His wife said on January 9, 2008, that he had died in Cuba on January 7 and had been cremated.

Bibliography 
Articles
"Why I Split The CIA And Spilled The Beans". (Archived copy)Esquire, June 1975. Full issue available.
 "Where Myths Lead To Murder". CovertAction Information Bulletin, No. 1, July 1988. (pp. 4–7) Full issue available.
 "A Friendly Interview". CovertAction Information Bulletin, No. 19, Spring–Summer 1983. (pp. 33–34) Full issue available.
 "Changes in Eastern Europe". CovertAction Information Bulletin, No. 35, Fall 1990. (pp. 3–4) Full issue available.

Books
 Inside the Company: CIA Diary. Penguin, 1975. . 629 pages.
 Dirty Work: The CIA in Western Europe. Edited by Lois Wolf. Lyle Stuart, 1978. . 318 pages.
 Dirty Work 2: The CIA in Africa. Edited by Lois Wolf. Lyle Stuart, January 1979. . 258 pages.
 On the Run. Lyle Stuart, June 1987. . 400 pages.
 White Paper Whitewash: Interviews with Philip Agee on the CIA and El Salvador. Edited by Warner Poelchau. Deep Cover Books, 1982. , . 203 pages.

Interviews
 "An Interview with Philip Agee: Confessions of an Ex-CIA Man". Ann Arbor Sun, February 28, 1975.

Reports
The CIA Against Latin America: Special Case: Ecuador. Ministry of Foreign Affairs and Human Mobility (Ecuador), December 2014.

Articles by other authors
 Kaeten Mistry, A Transnational Protest against the National Security State: Whistle-Blowing, Philip Agee, and Networks of Dissent, Journal of American History, Volume 106, Issue 2, September 2019, Pages 362–389
Shane, Scott. "Philip Agee, 72, Is Dead; Exposed Other C.I.A. Officers" (Obituary). The New York Times, January 10, 2008.
 Agee, Chris John. "Bridging the Gap: Philip Agee, 1935–2008". NACLA Report on the Americas, January/February 2009. pp. 9–13.
 "Remembering Philip Agee". Socialism & Democracy Online, March 6, 2011.
Talks given by Melvin Wulf, William Schaap, and Len Weinglass at a memorial for Philip Agee held at the West Side Y in New York City, on May 3, 2009.

Filmography
Documentaries
 Fidel: The Untold Story. Directed by Estela Bravo. First Run/Icarus Films, 2001. . 91 min.
 Commentary provided by interviews with Agee.
 On Company Business . Directed by Allan Francovich. 1980.  2h 54min.  IMDB

Television
Alternative Views, with Frank Morrow & Douglas Kellner.
Episode 540: The Company and the Country: A Conversation with Phil Agee, Pt. 1 (November 1995)
 Episode 541: The Company and the Country: A Conversation with Phil Agee, Pt. 2 (November 1995)
 Episode 445: Philip Agee Looks at the Gulf War (May 1991)
 Speech recorded April, 1991 at MIT.

Public Speaking
 Testimony at the 14th World Festival for Youth and Students in Havana regarding US terrorism against Cuba. Alternative Views, 1997.

See also 

 William Blum
 CounterSpy
 Victor Marchetti
 Ralph McGehee
 Lindsay Moran
 Clive Ponting
 L. Fletcher Prouty
 William Schaap
 Frank Snepp
 Edward Snowden
 John Stockwell
 Peter Wright

References

External links 
 
 
 
Philip Agee Papers, Tamiment Library and Robert F. Wagner Labor Archives at New York University.

1935 births
2008 deaths
American expatriates in Cuba
American foreign policy writers
American male non-fiction writers
20th-century American memoirists
American political writers
American spies
American whistleblowers
Deaths from ulcers
Espionage writers
Fredric G. Levin College of Law alumni
Historians of the Central Intelligence Agency
Jesuit High School (Tampa) alumni
People deported from the United Kingdom
People of the Central Intelligence Agency
University of Notre Dame alumni
20th-century American male writers